Anthodiscus montanus is a species of plant in the Caryocaraceae family. It is endemic to Colombia.

References

montanus
Endangered plants
Endemic flora of Colombia
Taxonomy articles created by Polbot